Randy Laverty (born March 8, 1953) is a former Democratic member of the Arkansas Senate, who represented the 2nd District from 2003 through 2013. Previously he was a member of the Arkansas House of Representatives from 1995 through 2001.

Education
Laverty obtained his BA from Arkansas Tech University.

Organizations
Laverty is a member of Kiwanis Club.

Political experience
Before Laverty was an Arkansas state senator he was a representative in the Arkansas House of Representatives from 1995 to 2000. Prior to his membership Laverty was a member of Jasper School Board from 1982 to 2000.

Family
Randy Laverty is married to his wife Virginia Lee and together the two have 3 children.

Religion
Laverty is a Baptist.

External links
Arkansas State Legislature – Senator Randy Laverty official government website
Project Vote Smart – Senator Randy Laverty (AR) profile
Follow the Money – Randy Laverty
2006 2004 2002 campaign contributions

References

Arkansas state senators
Members of the Arkansas House of Representatives
1953 births
Living people
20th-century American politicians
21st-century American politicians